The Junell Center is a 6,500 seat multi-purpose arena in San Angelo, Texas.  It was built in 2001. It is the home of the Angelo State University Rams & Ram Belles' basketball teams and the Ram Belles' volleyball team.

It features a 9x12 foot video screen and an Honors Lounge housed in the Junell Center, overlooking the Stephens Arena floor. A Hall of Fame concourse heralds the accomplishments of ASU athletes through the ages.

In addition to athletics it features speaking engagements, distinguished lecture series, cultural programs, exhibitions as many community activities that are staged in this facility. Angelo State frequently holds concerts at the arena. Groups that have played there include Maroon 5, Baby Bash, Miranda Lambert, Hoobastank, Dj Dmoney, Lostprophets, Chingy and Dierks Bentley.

References
 Arena Facts

Basketball venues in Texas
College basketball venues in the United States
Indoor arenas in Texas
Sports venues in San Angelo, Texas
Volleyball venues in Texas
Angelo State Rams men's basketball